Shadrack Hoff (born 19 May 1973) is a South African runner, twice national men's 5.000 metres champion. He was born in Vryburg.

He finished sixth in 5000 metres at the 1992 World Junior Championships and also at the 2002 IAAF World Half Marathon Championships.

Personal bests
5000 metres - 13:14.16 min (1995)
10,000 metres - 27:43.89 min (1996)
Half marathon - 1:01:11 hrs (2000)
Marathon - 2:11:51 hrs (2005)

External links

1973 births
Living people
People from Vryburg
South African male long-distance runners
Athletes (track and field) at the 1996 Summer Olympics
Olympic athletes of South Africa
Athletes (track and field) at the 1998 Commonwealth Games
Commonwealth Games competitors for South Africa
South African male cross country runners
World Athletics Championships athletes for South Africa
20th-century South African people
21st-century South African people